Oleiros (Portuguese for potter) may refer to the following places:

Portugal
 Oleiros, Portugal, a municipality in the district of Castelo Branco
 A civil parish in the municipality
 Oleiros (Guimarães), a civil parish in the municipality of Guimarães
 A civil parish in the municipality of Ponte da Barca
 A civil parish in the municipality of Vila Verde

Spain 
 Oleiros, Galicia, a municipality in A Coruña, Galicia

See also 
 São Paio de Oleiros, a parish in the municipality of Santa Maria da Feira
 Oreiro